Štajerska Vas is a small village in the Municipality of Slovenske Konjice in eastern Slovenia. It lies immediately northeast of Loče. The area is part of the traditional region of Styria and is now included in the Savinja Statistical Region. The settlement of Štajerska Vas was created in 1999, when it was administratively separated from Spodnji Jernej.

Population
Following are 2007 population statistics for Štajerska Vas

Following is the population over time:

References

External links
Štajerska Vas at Geopedia

Populated places in the Municipality of Slovenske Konjice